Fiza Ali (born 5 October 1984) is a Pakistani model, actress, and singer. She started her modeling career in 1999. In 2003, she started her acting career with the drama serial Mehndi. Notable programs in which she has appeared include Love Life Aur Lahore, Chunri, Woh Subah Kab Aayegi and Moum. In 2012, she started hosting a morning program called Subh Ki Fiza on A-Plus. In 2013, she was replaced by Sahir Lodhi. Ali hosts ARY Zindagi's game show Eidi Sab Kay Liye.

Filmography

Film

Telefilm

Short film

Television

Anthology Series

Hosting

Discography

Awards and nominations

References

External links
 

Pakistani female models
Pakistani television actresses
Living people
20th-century Pakistani actresses
21st-century Pakistani actresses
Pakistani television hosts
1976 births
Female models from Punjab, Pakistan
Pakistani women television presenters
Muhajir people